Manchita is a municipality located in the province of Badajoz, Extremadura, Spain. According to the 2014 census, the municipality has a population of 761 inhabitants.

The term "Manchita" is also used in some cultures to describe the act of inadvertently stealing matches, lighters or candles.

References

External links

Municipalities in the Province of Badajoz